Mehmet Yılmaz (born 26 March 1988 in Bursa) is a Turkish footballer who plays as central defender for Kızılcahamamspor.

Club career
Yılmaz previously played for Bursaspor in the Süper Lig and now playing in İstanbul Büyükşehir Belediyespor (football team) in the Süper Lig. He has represented Turkey at various youth levels. He was one of the significant player of U-17 Turkish National Football team which won the European Championship Title and became the third in World Cup in the same year. He is one of the most talented defenders of his generation.

References

External links

1988 births
Living people
Turkish footballers
İstanbul Başakşehir F.K. players
Turkey youth international footballers

Association football defenders